Makah Reservation is an Indian reservation of the Makah Native Americans located on the northwestern tip of the Olympic Peninsula in Clallam County, Washington, United States. The northern boundary of the reservation is the Strait of Juan de Fuca. The western boundary is the Pacific Ocean. Its largest community is Neah Bay.

The Makah Tribe was also a whale hunting tribe. They especially hunted gray whale for its size and weight. Some times while hunting, they traveled 30, 40, or 100 miles out to sea.

The Makah in the early nineteenth century inhabited Cape Flattery, Washington. According to the Lewis and Clark expedition, they then numbered some 2,000. The Makah are the southernmost of the Wakashan linguistic group, and the only member of this family living within the current boundaries of the United States. Other bands are First Nations peoples on the west coast of Vancouver Island, British Columbia.

Makah culture was fundamentally that of the Pacific Northwest Coast area. In 1855 they ceded all their lands to the United States except a small area on Cape Flattery that was set aside as a reservation. Today most of the 1,600 Makah in the United States live on the Makah Reservation; their main tribal income is from forestry.

Non-tribal members visiting the reservation are required to purchase a pass upon entering the reservation.  Guests on official business are given a free pass.

History

Names 
The Makah tribe originally called themselves "Kwih-dich-chuh-ahtx" which roughly translates to "people who live by the rocks and seagulls," however, their neighbors referred to them as the "Makah" meaning "generous with food" which is the name now more commonly used when addressing the tribe.

First Non-Indian Contact 
Contact with the British trader, Captain John Meares, was the first instance of contact the Makah had with non-Indians. It took place in June of 1788; Meares had arrived near Cape Flattery where he encountered the Makah who were stubborn and unwilling to trade with the British.

Ozette Village 
The Makah originally resided in present-day Washington and occupied multiple villages all throughout the northwestern tip of the Olympic Peninsula. There are five major villages: Waatch, Sooes, Deah, Ozette, and Bahaada.

One of the most well known, Ozette, was a crucial location for Makah survival. It was the most popular area for whale hunting which was a traditionally significant food source for the tribe. Around roughly 1560 CE or 1700 CE, a mudslide buried Ozette until about 1970 when a storm revealed the village hidden under layers of earth and mud. Archaeologists, with the help from local Makah members and students, worked for years to carefully restore the village as best they could, and learned much about Makah cultures and traditions.

Treaty of Neah Bay 
On January 31, 1855, Governor Isaac I. Stevens met with Makah leaders and members, and presented them with the Neah Bay Treaty. The treaty set aside what is now the Makah Reservation for the Makah people to reside in. Though the treaty included many rules and regulations, one of the most well known agreements in the treaty is that it allowed the Makah to legally hunt whales, making it the only treaty between the United States and a tribe that allows for the hunting of whales. In signing and agreeing to the Neah Bay Treaty, the Makah gave up 300,000 acres of their land to the United States in return for a $30,000 annuity, and other agreements such as the right to whaling and sealing.

Culture

Architecture 
The excavation of the Ozette village uncovered the traditional longhouses which were roughly 30 by 70 feet and where often composed of five different living quarters, with a fire for cooking purposes at the center of each room. Because the Makah people often moved with the seasons, the longhouses were engineered in a way that allowed for easy removal of certain parts of the house so that they may be utilized in other locations.

Carved Masks 
The Makah website emphasizes that many Makah members depend on their traditional artistry for income. A popular artwork is carved masks which are made by carvers who use wood and patterns that are unique to the area. The carvings often revolve around key aspects of the Makah culture and are organized with the purpose of relaying a story that is passed down.

Whale Hunting 
Seeing as the Makah have always lived alongside and around the coast, their traditional foods revolve around marine life. Evidence shows that whales, especially, played a key role in the diet and culture of the Makah. Whale hunting is a special ritual central to the Makah culture: Makah hunters would spend weeks preparing themselves spiritually for the hunt. Paddling out in canoes, the men carefully observe the whales’ breathing and watch for the correct time to strike them with harpoons. Eventually, after following further steps to effectively  kill the whale, the hunters would bring it back to the village where they were greeted with many praises from the villagers.

Geography

Climate 
Based on data from the last ten years, the temperature on the Makah Reservation typically ranges from the mid thirties to high sixties (°F), so temperatures are generally on the cooler side all year round with the exception of a few instances. Humidity ranges between 79% to 87%, making it a generally humid location. Furthermore, precipitation tends to be heavier in the winter and spring months, especially in November, December, January, and March where the average precipitation days are higher than other months.

Population 
The total recorded population is 1,612 individuals of which the average age comes to roughly 32.6 years. The majority of the population comes from one race where American Indian and Alaska Native, and White are the most predominant. Hispanics or Latinos make up around 120 individuals.

118 individuals are with veteran status; the majority having served in the Vietnam War, or Gulf War in the 1990s.

Education and economy

Education 
One of the unique curriculums at the Makah Reservation is the Makah Language Program (MLP) which focuses on carrying and passing along the traditional Makah language, Qʷi·qʷidiččaq, to students.

Out of the 927 individuals twenty-five years or older, 86.4% have at least graduated high school and 14.1% have earned a bachelor’s degree or higher.

The education department of the Makah Tribe tends to give preference for scholarships to students living on the reservation because there is a better chance that they will return to the reservation and to work for the tribe. Furthermore, students are motivated to seek employment and study areas that would benefit the tribe such as environmental sciences and fisheries.

Employment and Income 
The unemployment rate is 16.4% for individuals sixteen years of age and older, and the median income for Makah households is roughly $47,000. A rise in tourism, which typically occurs around the summer, leads to a rise in employment for Makah members because there are more employment opportunities.(link) Popular tourist destinations located on the reservation are another major source of income for the Makah. A “Recreation Permit” of twenty dollars is required to access any of the multiple spots throughout the reservation and it boosts the tribe’s economy.

Of 605 employed individuals, 412 -which is the majority- are working what is considered a government job and the runner up is working for a private business or position with 118 individuals.

Popular Attractions and Events 
Each year, the Makah celebrate what they call “Makah Days” which occurs on the weekend nearest to August 26. June 2, 1924 was the day in which the Makah were officially given their right of suffrage, however, the Makah celebrated the anniversary of becoming United States’ citizens on August 26, 1913. The Makah Tribe comes together to organize many events and spectacles for these days, and they welcome others to celebrate with them.

Neah Bay Beaches, such as Hobuck Beach and Shi-Shi Beach, are also popular destinations for many visitors. The Hobuck Beach features the Hobuck Beach Resort for visitors, and they can also choose to take part in events such as the Hobuck Hoedown for entertainment. Shi-Shi Beach is most popular for its trail which is 2.5 miles long and features many sights along the way.

The Cape Flattery Trail is one of the more well-known trails on the Makah Reservation. It has multiple observation points and there is a clear view of Tatoosh Island, an island that is also a part of the Makah Reservation.

The Makah Cultural and Research Center is the museum on the reservation that opened in 1979 and is home to many artifacts relating to Makah history and culture. Many of the objects and exhibits come from the Ozette Archaeological Site and give insight into the traditional Makah way of life. An admission fee is required to enter the museum and it helps support the museum’s financial needs.

See also
 Indigenous languages of the Americas
 Nuu-chah-nulth
 Makah
 Makah Language

External links
 makah.com "Makah Tribe", official website
 The Makah Tribe: People of the Sea and the Forest, University of Washington Library
 Makah Tribal Profile
 "Makah Prepare to Hunt Whales", Turtle Track
 Andrew Engelson, "Makah Tribe's trail eases access to a wild stretch of coastline", Seattle Post-Intelligencer, 20 November 2003
 Forks Guide - S.R. 112 to Neah Bay

References

American Indian reservations in Washington (state)
Geography of Clallam County, Washington
Makah